The Bridge of Jerveshtik is a single-span bridge situated over the stream Jerveshtik (Yeghishe Arakyal, i.e. Elisha the Apostle), in a deep gorge 400 metres north-west of the Yeghishe Arakyal Monastery, within 5 kilometres of Mataghis Village, Martakert Region, Nagorno-Karabakh Republic (NKR) in the same direction.

History 
There exist no records as to the time of its construction, but its building peculiarities allow us to trace it back to the 12th to 13th centuries.

At present only the piers of the bridge of Jerveshtik are preserved. It remains unknown when it was destroyed, but this must have happened much earlier than the year 1884, as a traveler who saw it in the same year later wrote: "The bridge represents but three shaky beams covered with pieces of wood. About 200 feet beneath it in the opposite direction, amidst some prominent rocks run the stream Yeghishe Arakyal (Elisha the Apostle) in tremendous roar..." It is already a long time since the "shaky beams" connecting the piers were leveled with the ground. The cornerstones of the vault-bearing arch of the bridge were finely-dressed; its other parts, and particularly, its elevated main pier were built of undressed stone and mortar.
Span length: 6.0 metres; passage width: 3.30 metres; height above water level according to the reconstruction of the bridge: 11.25 metres.

References 

Bridges in Armenia
Former bridges